The 1975–76 John Player Cup was the fifth edition of England's premier rugby union club competition at the time. Gosforth won the competition defeating Rosslyn Park in the final. In the final Bob Mordell of Rosslyn Park punched Dave Robinson and was sent off after only ten minutes of the game. The event was sponsored for the first time by John Player cigarettes and the final was held at Twickenham Stadium.

Draw and results

First round

Second round

Quarter-finals

Semi-finals

Final

References

1975–76 rugby union tournaments for clubs
1975–76 in English rugby union
RFU Knockout Cup